Luigi Comencini (8 June 1916 – 6 April 2007) was an Italian film director. Together with Dino Risi, Ettore Scola and Mario Monicelli, he was considered among the masters of the commedia all'italiana genre.

His daughters Cristina and Francesca are both film directors.

Biography
His first successful movie was L'imperatore di Capri, featuring Totò. Comencini's 1953 Pane, amore e fantasia, with Vittorio De Sica and Gina Lollobrigida, is considered a primary example of neorealismo rosa (pink neorealism). It was followed by Pane, amore e gelosia.

After first directing Alberto Sordi in La bella di Roma (1955), Comencini again worked with Sordi in what is considered his masterwork, Tutti a casa, a bitter comedy about Italy after the armistice of 1943. The film won the Special Golden Prize at the 2nd Moscow International Film Festival. Also set in World War II, but devoted to the Italian partisans, is La ragazza di Bube (1963). This was followed by Incompreso (1966, based on the English novel by Florence Montgomery).

Comencini obtained an outstanding success with what is ranked amongst the best productions of Italian television, The Adventures of Pinocchio (1972). In the same year, he directed the feature film Lo scopone scientifico, a dark comedy with Sordi and Silvana Mangano. In 1975, he released the mystery La donna della domenica, featuring Marcello Mastroianni, Jacqueline Bisset and Jean-Louis Trintignant.

Comencini's subsequent works were characterized by the presence of famous Italian actors of the time: Ugo Tognazzi in Il gatto (1977), or Nino Manfredi in his episode of Basta che non si sappia in giro. In the 1980s, Comencini's movies met with less success but his Cuore television series of 1984 was praised.

He died in Rome after a long illness in 2007.

Filmography

 Bambini in città (1947)
 Hey Boy (Proibito rubare) (1948)
 The Emperor of Capri (L'imperatore di Capri) (1949)
 L'ospedale del delitto (1950)
 Behind Closed Shutters (Persiane chiuse) (1950)
 Heidi (1952)
 La Tratta delle bianche (1953)
 La valigia dei sogni (1953)
 Bread, Love and Dreams (Pane, amore e fantasia) (1953)
 Bread, Love and Jealousy (Pane, amore e gelosia) (1954)
 The Belle of Rome (La bella di Roma) (1955)
 The Window to Luna Park (1957)
 Husbands in the City (Mariti in città) (1957)
 Mogli pericolose (1958)
 Le sorprese dell'amore (1959)
 And That on Monday Morning (1959)
 Everybody Go Home (Tutti a casa) (1960)
 A cavallo della tigre (1961)
 Il commissario (1962)
 La ragazza di Bube (1963)
 Tre notti d'amore (1964)
 La mia signora (1964)
 Il compagno Don Camillo (1965)
 Six Days a Week (La bugiarda) (1965)
 Le bambole (1965, episode "Il trattato di eugenetica")
 Misunderstood (Incompreso) (1966)
 Italian Secret Service (1968)
 Infanzia, vocazione e prime esperienze di Giacomo Casanova, veneziano (1969)
 Senza sapere niente di lei (1969)
 The Adventures of Pinocchio (1972, TV series)
 Lo scopone scientifico (The Scientific Cardplayer) (1973)
 Somewhere Beyond Love (Delitto d'amore) (1974)
 Mio Dio, come sono caduta in basso! (1974)
 La donna della domenica (1975)
 Basta che non si sappia in giro (1976, episode "L'equivoco) Quelle strane occasioni (1976)
 Signore e signori, buonanotte (1976)
 The Cat (Il gatto) (1977)
 L'ingorgo - Una storia impossibile (1978)
 Voltati Eugenio (1980)
 Cercasi Gesù (1982)
 Cuore (1984, TV series)
  (1986)
 A Boy from Calabria (Un ragazzo di Calabria) (1987)
 La Bohème (1988)
 Buon Natale... buon anno (1989)
 Marcellino'' (1992)

References

External links

 

1916 births
2007 deaths
People from Salò
Italian film directors
Italian Waldensians
German-language film directors
David di Donatello winners
Burials at the Cimitero Flaminio